Insular script was a medieval script system originating from Ireland that spread to Anglo-Saxon England and continental Europe under the influence of Irish Christianity. Irish missionaries took the script to continental Europe, where they founded monasteries such as Bobbio. The scripts were also used in monasteries like Fulda, which were influenced by English missionaries.  They are associated with Insular art, of which most surviving examples are illuminated manuscripts. It greatly influenced Irish orthography and modern Gaelic scripts in handwriting and typefaces.

Insular script comprised a diverse family of scripts used for different functions.  At the top of the hierarchy was the Insular half-uncial (or "Insular majuscule"), used for important documents and sacred text. The full uncial, in a version called "English uncial", was used in some English centres. Then "in descending order of formality and increased speed of writing" came "set minuscule", "cursive minuscule" and "current minuscule".  These were used for non-scriptural texts, letters, accounting records, notes, and all the other types of written documents.

Origin
The scripts developed in Ireland in the 7th century and were used as late as the 19th century, though its most flourishing period fell between 600 and 850. They were closely related to the uncial and half-uncial scripts, their immediate influences; the highest grade of Insular script is the majuscule Insular half-uncial, which is closely derived from Continental half-uncial script.

Appearance

Works written in Insular scripts commonly use large initial letters surrounded by red ink dots (although this is also true of other scripts written in Ireland and England).  Letters following a large initial at the start of a paragraph or section  often gradually diminish in size as they are written across a line or a page, until the normal size is reached, which is called a "diminuendo" effect, and is a distinctive Insular innovation, which later influenced Continental illumination style.    Letters with ascenders (b, d, h, l, etc.) are written with triangular or wedge-shaped tops. The bows of letters such as b, d, p, and q are very wide. The script uses many ligatures and has many unique scribal abbreviations, along with many borrowings from Tironian notes.

Insular script was spread to England by the Hiberno-Scottish mission; previously, uncial script had been brought to England by Augustine of Canterbury. The influences of both scripts produced the Insular script system.
Within this system, the palaeographer Julian Brown identified five grades, with decreasing formality:
Insular half-uncial, or "Irish majuscule": the most formal; became reserved for rubrics (highlighted directions) and other displays after the 9th century.
Insular hybrid minuscule: the most formal of the minuscules, came to be used for formal church books when use of the "Irish majuscule" diminished.
Insular set minuscule
Insular cursive minuscule
Insular current minuscule: the least formal; current here means ‘running’ (rapid).
Brown has also postulated two phases of development for this script, Phase II being mainly influenced by Roman Uncial examples, developed at Wearmouth-Jarrow and typified by the Lindisfarne Gospels.

Usage
Insular script was used not only for Latin religious books, but also for every other kind of book, including vernacular works. Examples include the Book of Kells, the Cathach of St. Columba, the Ambrosiana Orosius, the Durham Gospel Fragment, the Book of Durrow, the Durham Gospels, the Echternach Gospels, the Lindisfarne Gospels, the Lichfield Gospels, the St. Gall Gospel Book, and the Book of Armagh.

Insular script was influential in the development of Carolingian minuscule in the scriptoria of the Carolingian empire.

In Ireland, Insular script was superseded in  850 by Late Insular script; in England, it was followed by a form of Caroline minuscule.

The Tironian et  — equivalent of ampersand (&) — was in widespread use in the script (meaning agus ‘and’ in Irish and ond ‘and’ in Old English) and is occasionally continued in modern Gaelic typefaces derived from Insular script.

Unicode
Unicode treats representation of letters of the Latin alphabet written in insular script as a typeface choice that needs no separate coding. Only a few Insular letters have specific code-points because they are used by phonetic specialists. To render the full alphabet correctly, a suitable display font should be chosen. To display the specialist characters, there are several fonts that may be used; three free ones that support these characters are Junicode, Montagel, and Quivira. Gentium and Charis SIL support the alphabetic letters (U+A77x and U+A78x).

According to Michael Everson, in the 2006 Unicode proposal for these characters:

See also
 Carolingian minuscule
 Gaelic type
 Hiberno-Saxon art
 Insular G
 Latin delta
 Tironian et
 Irish orthography
 List of Hiberno-Saxon illustrated manuscripts

References

Sources
 O'Neill, Timothy. The Irish Hand: Scribes and Their Manuscripts From the Earliest Times. Cork: Cork University Press, 2014.

Further reading
 'Manual of Latin Palaeography' (A comprehensive PDF file containing 82 pages profusely illustrated, June 2014).

External links
 Pfeffer Mediæval An Insular minuscule as a Unicode font (strictly speaking, a Carolingian minuscule with a set of Insular variants)

Culture of medieval Scotland
Early medieval literature
Latin-script calligraphy
Medieval scripts
Texts of medieval Ireland
Western calligraphy